Zana Clarke (born 13 October 1965) is an Australian composer. She studied recorder with Ruth Wilkinson and Hans Dieter Michatz and violin with Anne Martoni and Marco Van Pagge, and began to play in youth orchestras at age 12.  She graduated from Melbourne University with a Bachelor of Arts in Latin and Classics and a Bachelor of Arts in Music.

In 1991 Clarke moved to Armidale, New South Wales, and completed a teaching degree. She taught violin and recorder in her own studio, and also lectured at the University of New England. She founded the youth recorder ensemble Batalla Famossa, and performed with the ensembles Weird Sisters from 1991–97 and Cantigas from 1995, recording a number of CDs.

Clarke became the founding director of Orpheus Music which publishes a Young Composer Series and commissions and publishes new works by Australian composers for recorder.

Works
Clarke composes mainly for recorder, incorporating Medieval and Middle Eastern sounds and experimental techniques including vocalized recorder. Selected works include:
Dreams Inside the Air Tunnel
Aerial View of the Boarder Bridge for vocalized recorder
Cold Honey for solo tenor recorder
Mind your Step for 2 guitars

References

1965 births
Living people
20th-century classical composers
21st-century classical composers
Australian music educators
Australian women classical composers
Australian classical composers
Women music educators
20th-century women composers
21st-century women composers